Awards and decorations of Belarus are governed by the Law of the Republic of Belarus on State Awards of 18 May 2004.

The highest award is the title of the Hero of Belarus. The law also specifies orders, medals and honorary titles of Belarus.

Hero of Belarus

Awardees

Orders

Medals

Commemorative medals
Additionally the President can introduce jubilee medals (юбiлейныя мядалi) on occasions of important anniversaries observed in Belarus.

Honorary Titles
Honorary titles are introduced for various categories of professions and occupations. The honorary titles are accompanied by the corresponding diploma and badges.

Awards and decorations of the Belarusian Democratic Republic

In 1949, the Rada of the Belarusian Democratic Republic in exile under President Mikoła Abramčyk has introduced a number of civic and military awards. There has been a number of decorations in the 1950s.

In 2016, the Rada of the BDR has announced plans to renew the decorations. In 2018, the Rada has awarded 130 Belarusian activists and politicians, as well as a number of foreigners, with a newly created medal commemorating the 100th anniversary of the Belarusian Democratic Republic.

Other former military and state awards

Notes
  The Order is always worn in full, the ribbon was drawn to show what it looks like.
  The ribbons are shown to denote the ribbon colour. These badges are always worn in full.

See also
Hero of Belarus
Orders, decorations, and medals of the Soviet Union
Awards and decorations of the Russian Federation

References

External links

 Law on State Awards
 Russian site about Belarusian medals and orders